Maurice George Morrow, Baron Morrow (born 27 September 1948) is a Unionist politician from Northern Ireland representing the Democratic Unionist Party (DUP) who has been Chairman of the DUP since 2000. He was made a life peer in June 2006. He was also a councillor on Dungannon and South Tyrone Borough Council representing Dungannon Town.

He was educated at Ballygawley Primary School, Dungannon Secondary and Dungannon Technical College, following which he pursued a career as an estate agent. His political career began in 1973 when he was elected to Fermanagh District Council. He served as a MLA of the Northern Ireland Assembly from 1998, until losing his seat in 2017. In July 2000 he became Minister for Social Development in the Northern Ireland Executive, a position held until October 2001, during which time he was credited with implementing policies recognising the needs of the elderly, the farming community and introduced new measures to tackle welfare fraud.

It was announced on 11 April 2006 that Morrow would be one of the first three members of the DUP to be created life peers, giving the party its first representation in the House of Lords.  He was created Baron Morrow, of Clogher Valley in the County of Tyrone, on 7 June 2006 and was formally introduced to the House of Lords on 27 June.

Recent history
In 2012 his constituency office in Dungannon was broken into and ransacked. Morrow vowed it would be business as usual despite the burglary.

After hearing testimony about children and adults forced to work in brothels, farms and factories, including that of a Romanian woman who had been kidnapped in London and forced to work as a prostitute in Ireland, he put forward a bill to the Northern Ireland Assembly: the Human Trafficking and Exploitation Act, passed in 2015, which made Northern Ireland the first and only place in the UK where the act of buying sex is a crime. The act of selling sex, by contrast, was decriminalised.  The law was opposed by campaigners who wished to see the total decriminalisation of sex work. An application for judicial review failed on the death of the campaigner who had proposed it.

The other DUP peers appointed as "working" life peers alongside Morrow in 2006 were Wallace Browne, former Lord Mayor of Belfast, and Eileen Paisley, a former vice-president of the DUP and wife of the late Leader of the DUP, Ian Paisley. At the same time, it was announced that David Trimble, former MP and former leader of the Ulster Unionists, was also being appointed as a working life peer.

Personal life
Morrow is married and has two daughters. He maintains an interest in rural development.

References

External links
 Maurice Morrow MLA, DUP website
 List of Members, House of Lords
 Notice of Lord Morrow's Introduction, House of Lords – Minute
 Four new unionist peers appointed, BBC News, 11 April 2006
 TheyWorkForYou Voting Record, TheyWorkForYou TheyWorkForYou

1948 births
Living people
Democratic Unionist Party life peers
Members of the Northern Ireland Forum
Northern Ireland MLAs 1998–2003
Northern Ireland MLAs 2003–2007
Northern Ireland MLAs 2007–2011
Northern Ireland MLAs 2011–2016
Northern Ireland MLAs 2016–2017
Ministers of the Northern Ireland Executive (since 1999)
Politicians from County Tyrone
Democratic Unionist Party MLAs
Members of Fermanagh District Council
Members of Dungannon and South Tyrone Borough Council
Presbyterians from Northern Ireland
People from Dungannon
Life peers created by Elizabeth II